Cuna may refer to:

 Credit Union National Association
 CUNA Credit Union, a defunct credit union based in Madison, Wisconsin
 CUNA Mutual Group, a mutual insurance company based in Madison, Wisconsin
 Kuna (people), of Panama and Colombia
 Kuna language, spoken by the Kuna people
 Cuna (bivalve), a genus of bivalve mollusc